The women's taijiquan and taijijian competition at the 2018 Asian Games was held from 19 to 20 August at the Jakarta International Expo.

Schedule
All times are Western Indonesia Time (UTC+07:00)

Results

References

External links
Wushu at the 2018 Asian Games

Women's taijiquan